CPQD is a Research and Development Center in Telecommunications and one of the largest Latin American R&D centers in Telecommunications and IT. Located in Campinas, São Paulo, Brazil, CPQD has operated as a contractor for institutions and enterprises in a wide range of fields: telecommunications, finance, energy, industrial, corporate and public administration.

History 
CPQD was founded in 1976, as a Telecom research and development center for Telebras. In 1998, with the privatization of Telebras, CPQD became an independent Foundation.

Selected projects 
The CONVERTE Project, started in 2003 in partnership with Trópico Telecomunicações Avançadas, developed new technologies for convergent next-generation networks.

CPQD has participated in the development of the Brazilian digital television system (SBTVD).

The GIGA Project, developed by CPQD along with several other research institutions, is focused on the development of new technologies for high speed optical networks.

In 2013, CPQD made a partnership with the Brazilian Ministry of Defence to develop communication technologies for the Brazilian Armed Forces.

References

External links 

 CPQD - Connect to the new
 GIGA Project 
 Trópico Telecomunicações Avançadas

Research institutes in Brazil
Scientific organizations established in 1976
1976 establishments in Brazil